On August 31, 1969, a Cessna 172 crashed in Newton, Iowa, killing world heavyweight champion boxer Rocky Marciano and two

The flight

It had departed from Chicago Midway Airport at 6 pm (1800 hrs) and was en route to Des Moines, where Marciano was to celebrate his 46th birthday at a party the next day. This was to be a surprise party for him; he was to give a speech in support of his friend, Louis Fratto's son. Marciano intended to later fly to Florida to celebrate his birthday at home with his family.

Accident
A storm system was building in the Des Moines region at the time of the accident. The airplane's pilot was 37-year-old Glenn Belz, who was not experienced with night flying or flying during bad weather. Belz decided to head to Newton instead of continuing to Des Moines as planned, to avoid the bad weather. While trying to land at Newton the aircraft entered low cloud, attempted an overshoot and the pilot lost control, impacting a lone oak tree in a corn field. The airplane was also short of fuel at the time of the crash.

Witness Coleen Swarts observed the airplane reverse its course and then heard a loud sound as it crashed.

References

External links
planecrashinfo.com

Newton Cessna 172 crash
Aviation accidents and incidents in Iowa
1969 in Iowa
Rocky Marciano
August 1969 events in the United States
Sports-related aviation accidents and incidents